Imatong refers to:
Imatong State, one of the 28 states of South Sudan
Imatong county, a former region of the Southern Sudanese state of Eastern Equatoria
Imatong Mountains, a range in southern Sudan
Imatong people, an ethnic group living in the Southern Sudanese state of Eastern Equatoria